Rhydypennau may refer to 

Rhydypennau, Ceredigion - a hamlet in Ceredigion, Wales
Rhydypennau, Cardiff - an area of Cardiff, Wales
Rhydypennau Library, a library serving Rhydypennau, Cardiff